Roider Jackl (17 June 1906 in Weihmichl – 8 May 1975 in Freising; real name: Jakob Roider) was a German performer, singer, and folk singer, who performed in Bavarian language.

He became famous in the 1950s especially because of the writing and performing of Gstanzls (short Bavarian mocking songs). A Gstanzl normally consists of four lines, sometimes eight, and is sung in dialect. He performed for example in the Bayerischer Rundfunk and in the Nockherberg. He was a master of the political Gstanzl. Karl Valentin was among his admirers.

References

Further reading 
 Jakob Roider: Gstanzln vom Roider Jackl. Hieber, München o. J. [1949].
 Jakob Roider: Der Roider Jackl, mit Illustrationen von Josef Oberberger. Rosenheimer Verlag, Rosenheim 1980, .
 Werner Roider (Hrsg.): Der Roider Jackl. Rosenheimer Verlag, Rosenheim 2002, .

External links

 
 Roider Jackl, official website
 Roider Jackl in Bayerisches Musiker-Lexikon Online (BMLO)

German folk singers
German male comedians
1906 births
1975 deaths
20th-century German male singers
20th-century comedians